The 1949 Campeonato de Selección y Competencia was the 33rd season of the Peruvian Primera División. Eight teams participated in the second-to-last amateur-status championship, which was played as a triple round-robin tournament. The champions were Universitario. No team was relegated; therefore the top-flight grew to 10 teams for 1950.

Standings

External links 
 Peru 1949 season at RSSSF
 Peruvian Football League News 

Peru1
1949 in Peruvian football
Peruvian Primera División seasons